Amand Vanderhagen or Amand Van der Hagen (1753–1822) was a Flemish clarinetist and teacher. He is known for writing Méthode nouvelle et raisonnée pour la clarinette, the earliest extant method book for the Classical clarinet. He is considered a key figure in the development of clarinet pedagogy.

References

1753 births
1822 deaths
Clarinetists